The  Carea Leonés (English: Leonese Sheepdog) is a breed of herding dog from León, Castile and León, Spain (Europe), and is used as a sheepdog. For centuries, they tended flocks of Churra (sheep) in the mountains of the historical region of León.

History
The Carea Leonés is a dog whose morphology and character have been molded by its environment, both physical and human. Regarding the physical, it can say that this breed is rooted in the regions of the province of León and Zamora. This was so because it are agricultural areas where crops shared its existence with sheep herds. For such coexistence come to fruition, and due to shortage of shepherd men who were at any particular time, and the number of heads could be high, it was necessary to resort to a helper who will control cattle to temptation, and this was the Carea Leonés.

Ancestor of other breeds
When Spain colonized America, they introduced Churra sheep for food and fiber. They also brought their Carea Leonés to manage the huge flocks. These dogs contributed to the type of herding dogs found throughout California and the Southwestern United States including the Australian Shepherd.

Appearance

Their coat is smooth and short or moderate length and slightly wavy, and ranges from black to dark liver or merle with white and or tan trim.

Size and weight 
They range in size from 18 to 23 inches (45 cm to 58 cm) and in weight from 30 to 70 pounds (14–32 kg).

Temperament
This breed is used as a working dog and as a companion. Because of its intelligence, the Carea Leonés, like most sheepdogs, is easy to train.

Function
The function of Carea Leonés it is to carry and control livestock, whether sheep, bovine or equine, it is a stubborn and courageous animal with the cattle, not allowing these daunted it. This is an important detail and valued by shepherds, and the dog should be strong with some bite to the respect earned it by the cattle so it can control a large number of sheep and impose to the size of cows or mares, with the possibility of receiving a kick. In mountain areas these are used more for that type of cattle and take to the home the sheep, for the large herds spend most of the year, in the plain, paramos and shores where the carea is very necessary.

It is a very smart and intelligent animal, with great learning ability and willingness to work. It is a dog with good personality but is subject to the orders it receives from its owner.

Activities
The Carea Leonés can compete in dog agility trials, obedience, showmanship, flyball, tracking, and herding events. Herding instincts and trainability can be measured at noncompetitive herding tests. Careas exhibiting basic herding instincts can be trained to compete in herding trials.

See also
 Dogs portal
 List of dog breeds

References

Herding dogs
Dog breeds originating in Castile and León
Rare dog breeds